The United States of America Mathematical Olympiad (USAMO) is a highly selective high school mathematics competition held annually in the United States. Since its debut in 1972, it has served as the final round of the American Mathematics Competitions. In 2010, it split into the USAMO and the United States of America Junior Mathematical Olympiad (USAJMO).

Qualification for the USAMO or USAJMO is considered one of the most prestigious awards for high school students in the United States. Top scorers on both six-question, nine-hour mathematical proof competitions are invited to join the Mathematical Olympiad Program to compete and train to represent the United States at the International Mathematical Olympiad.

Eligibility
In order to be eligible to take the USAMO, a participant must be either a U.S. citizen or a legal resident of the United States or Canada. Only U.S. permanent residents and citizens may join the American IMO team. In addition, all participants, regardless of geographic location, must meet qualification indices determined by previous rounds of the AMC contests. Entry to the USAMO is by invitation only.

History
The USAMO was created in 1972 at the initiative of Nura D. Turner and Samuel L. Greitzer, and served as the next round to the AHSME until 1982. In 1983, the American Invitational Mathematics Examination was introduced as a bridge between the AHSME and USAMO. In 2010, the USAMO split into the USAMO and USAJMO.

Historical participant selection process
The USAMO (and the USAJMO since 2010) is restricted to approximately 500 (250 prior to 2006) participants combined each year. To keep this quota constant, the AMC Committee uses a selection process, which has seen a number of revisions in the competition's history.

Present
AMC 12 based indices are determined by taking AMC 12 Score + 10*(AIME Score). AMC 10 based indices are determined by taking AMC 10 Score + 10*(AIME Score). Cutoffs, based on AMC 12 indices, are determined so that approximately 260-270 students qualify for the USAMO. Cutoffs, based on AMC 10 indices, are determined so that approximately 230-240 students qualify for the USAJMO. If a student took the AMC 10 and 12 (i.e. AMC 10A and 12B or AMC 12A and 10B) and qualified for both the USAMO and USAJMO, the student must take the USAMO. In 2020, due to grading constraints caused by the COVID-19 pandemic, lower numbers of students were admitted (223 USAMO qualifiers and 158 USAJMO qualifiers). To increase the limited pool of female students for team selection, females received a lower cutoff than males. This policy change was never officially announced by the MAA and was decided upon a week before the administration of the exam.

2011
Since 2011, the goal has been to select approximately 500 students total for the two Olympiads where 270 students qualify for the USA Mathematical Olympiad (USAMO) and 230 students qualify for the 2011 USA Junior Mathematical Olympiad (USAJMO). Selection for the USAMO and USAJMO are made according to the following rules:

1. U.S. citizens and students residing in the United States and Canada (with qualifying scores) are eligible to take the USAMO and USAJMO.

2. Selection to the USAMO will be based on the USAMO index which is defined as AMC 12 Score + 10 * AIME Score. Selection to the USAJMO will be based on the USAJMO index which is defined as AMC 10 Score + 10 * AIME Score.

3. Only AMC 12 A or AMC 12 B takers who are U.S. citizens and students residing in the United States and Canada will be eligible for the USAMO.

4. Only AMC 10 A or AMC 10 B takers who are U.S. citizens and students residing in the United States and Canada will be eligible for the USAJMO. This automatically limits Junior Math Olympiad participation to 10th graders and below. Students who take ONLY the AMC 10 test, whether AMC 10 A or AMC 10 B or both, will NOT be eligible for the USAMO regardless of their score on the AMC 10 or the AIME.

5. The approximately 260-270 individual students with the top AMC 12 based USAMO indices will be invited to take the USAMO. These indices will be selected from the pool of AMC 12 takers with an AIME score.

6. The approximately 230-240 individual students with the top AMC 10 based USAMO indices will be invited to take the USAJMO. These indices will be selected from the pool of AMC 10 takers with an AIME score after removing students who also took an AMC 12 test and qualified for the USAMO in rule 5. This means young students MUST take the USAMO if they qualify through an AMC 12 index.

7. We will select the student with the numerically largest index, whether AMC 10 based USAJMO index or AMC 12 based USAMO index, from each US state not already represented in either the USAMO or the USAJMO. The student will be invited to the USAMO if the numerically highest index in the state is AMC 12 based, and invited to the USAJMO if the index is AMC 10 based.

2010
Starting in 2010, the USA Mathematical Olympiad is split into two parts.  The USA Mathematical Olympiad will be administered to approximately 270 students, mostly selected from top ranking AMC12 participants.  The AMC10 only participants will take part in USA Junior Mathematical Olympiad.

1.Selection to the USAMO and JMO will be based on the USAMO index which is defined as AMC score + 10 * AIME score.

2.Only AMC 12A or AMC 12B takers are eligible for the USAMO (with the slight exception mentioned in item 5 below).

3.Only AMC 10A and AMC 10B takers are eligible for the JMO.  (This automatically limits Junior Math Olympiad participation to 10th graders and below.)

4.Approximately the top 260 AMC12 based USAMO indices will be invited to the USAMO.

5.In order to find unrecognized young talent, AMC 10 takers who score 11 or more on the AIME will be invited to the USAMO. (In 2008 and 2009 this was 5 or 6 students).

6.Select the top index from any state not already represented in the USAMO.

7.Approximately the top 220-230 students with AMC10 based USAMO indices and not already selected to the USAMO via an AMC12 based index will be invited to the JMO.

Source:

2008
Selection for the USAMO will be made according to the following rules:

1. The goal is to select about 500 of the top scorers from this year's AIME and AMC 12A, AMC 12B, AMC 10A and AMC 10B contests to participate in the USAMO.

2. Selection will be based on the USAMO index which is defined as 10 times the student's AIME score plus the student's score on the AMC 12 or the AMC 10.

3. The first selection will be the approximately 330 highest
USAMO indices of students taking the AMC 12A or AMC
12B contest.

4. The lowest AIME score among those 330 first selected will
determine a floor value. The second selection of approximately 160 USAMO participants will be among students in
the 10th grade and below who received an AIME score at least as high as the floor value. If there are more than 160
young students with a score above the floor value, then approximately 160 students will be selected from this group by using the USAMO index.

5 The student with the highest USAMO index from each state, territory, or U.S. possession not already represented in the selection of the first and second groups will be invited to take the USAMO.

6. To adjust for variations in contest difficulty, the number of students selected from A & B contests will be proportional to the number of students who took the A & B Contests.

7. In advising young students (in grade 10 or below) who desire to be selected for the USAMO whether to take the AMC 12 contest or the AMC 10 contest, please be aware of the following facts:

a. In 2007, among 506 students invited to take the USAMO, 229 were in 10th grade and below. Those students had scored 6 or greater on the AIME.

b. Among those 229 students, 87 had their AIME qualifying high score based on the AMC 12 and 142 had their AIME qualifying high score based on the AMC 10.

c. In 2007, among 8,312 students who took the AIME, 2,696 were in grades 10 and below. Of those, 998 qualified for the AIME from the AMC 12 and 1,698 qualified from the AMC 10.

2006-2007
Beginning in 2006, the USAMO was expanded to include approximately 500 students (around 430 were actually invited, read below) due to a proposal and sponsorship from the Art of Problem Solving website:
 The goal is to select about 500 of the top scorers from this year's AIME and AMC 12A, AMC 12B, AMC 10A and AMC 10B contests to participate in the USAMO.
 Selection will be based on the USAMO index which is defined as 10 times the student's AIME score plus the student's score on the AMC 12 or the AMC 10.
 The first selection will be the approximately 240 highest USAMO indices of students taking the AMC 12A or AMC 12B contest.
 The lowest AIME score among those 240 first selected will determine a floor value. The second selection of approximately 120 USAMO participants will be among students in the 10th grade and below who received an AIME score at least as high as the floor value. If there are more than 120 young students with a score above the floor value, then approximately 120 students will be selected from this group by using the USAMO index.
 The student with the highest USAMO index from each state, territory, or U.S. possession not already represented in the selection of the first and second groups will be invited to take the USAMO.
 To adjust for variations in contest difficulty, the number of students selected from A & B contests will be proportional to the number of students who took the A & B Contests.
 The selection process is designed to favor students who take the more mathematically comprehensive AMC 12A and AMC 12B contests.*
Source: American Mathematics Competitions

Statement 7 above (quoted from the AMC website) has recently come under controversy. During the selection for the 2006 USAMO, students who qualified by the floor value (in grades seven through ten) were qualified based on AMC scores as well (see * below) as their AIME scores, yet no distinction was made between the AMC 12 contest and the generally easier AMC 10 contest, giving those who took the AMC 10 an advantage over those who took the AMC 12. Students in grades seven through ten who were in the first selection of qualifiers (see 3. above) would still have qualified even if they had taken the AMC 10, except in the rare case that they set the floor themselves, making the AMC 12 still non-advantageous.

2002-2005
Since 2002, the following set of guidelines have been adopted for use in determining each year's USAMO participants:

 The goal is to select about 250 of the top scorers from the prior AIME and AMC 12A, AMC 12B, AMC 10A and AMC 10B contests to participate in the USAMO.
 Selection will be based on the USAMO index which is defined as 10 times the student's AIME score plus the student's score on the AMC 12 or the AMC 10.
 The first selection (consisting of participants from all grade levels) will be the approximately 160 highest USAMO indices of students taking the AMC 12A or AMC 12B contest.
 The lowest AIME score among those 160 first selected will determine a floor value. The second selection of USAMO participants will be from the highest USAMO indices among students in grades seven through ten who got an AIME score at least as high as the floor value. To note, during 2002-2005 period, this included all students in grades seven through ten.
 The student with the highest USAMO index from each state, territory, or U.S. possession not already represented in the selection of the first and second groups will be invited to take the USAMO.
 To adjust for variations in contest difficulty, the number of students selected from A & B contests will be proportional to the number of students who took the (A & B) Contests.
 The selection process is designed to favor students who take the more mathematically comprehensive AMC 12A and AMC 12B contests.

Source: American Mathematics Competitions

2001 and earlier
Prior to 2001, the following guidelines were used:

 First Group: The top 120 students.
 Second Group: The next 20 students in grades 11 and below.
 Third Group: The next 20 students in grades 10 or below.
 Fourth Group: The next 20 students in grades 9 or below.
 Fifth Group: One student from each state, one student from the combined U.S.A. Territories, and one student from the APO/FPO schools- if not represented in the first four groups.

Source: American Mathematics Competitions

Recent qualification indices

*In 2020, the AIME I took place as normal on March 11, 2020. However, the escalating COVID-19 Pandemic which had just shut down most U.S. Schools forced the postponement of the AIME II, which was scheduled for March 19, and the USA(J)MO which was scheduled for mid-April. Both competitions were eventually rescheduled in June as online competitions which students participated in at home and were renamed as the AOIME (American Online Invitational Mathematics Examination) and the USO(J)MO (United States Online (Junior) Mathematical Olympiad) respectively. They were sponsored by Art of Problem Solving (AoPS).

Test format and scoring

Post-2002

Since 2002, the USAMO has been a six-question, nine-hour mathematical proof competition spread out over two days. (The IMO uses the same format.) On each day, four and a half hours are given for three questions.

Each question is graded on a scale from 0 to 7, with a score of 7 representing a proof that is mathematically sound. Thus, a perfect score is 42 points. The number of perfect papers each year has varied depending on test difficulty. Regardless, the top 12 scorers are all named contest winners.

The scale of 0 to 7 goes as follows:
0 - No work, or completely trivial work
1-2 - Progress on the problem, but not completely solved
3-4 - All steps are present, but may lack clarity. (These scores are very rare.)
5-6 - Complete solution with minor errors
7 - Perfect solution

1996 to 2001
The test consisted of two three-problem sets. Three hours were given for each set; one set was given in the morning (9:00-12:00), and the other in the afternoon (1:00-4:00).

1995 and earlier
The test consisted of five problems to be solved in three and a half hours (earlier, three hours). Each problem was worth 20 points, for a perfect score of 100.

Test procedures
In most years, students have taken the USAMO at their respective high schools. Prior to 2002, the problems were mailed to the schools in sealed envelopes, not to be opened before the appointed time on the test day. Since 2002, test problems have been posted on the AMC website (see links below) fifteen minutes prior to the official start of the test. Student responses are then faxed back to the AMC office at the end of the testing period.

In 2002, the Akamai Foundation, as a major sponsor of the American Mathematics Competitions, invited all USAMO participants to take the test at a central event at MIT in Cambridge, Massachusetts, all expenses paid. In addition, Akamai invited all 2002 USAMO participants who were not high school seniors (approximately 160 students) to take part in an enlarged Mathematical Olympiad Program (also known as "MOP") program. Since holding this central event every year would be prohibitively expensive, it has been discontinued.  In 2004 and 2005, however, funding was found to send 30 rising freshmen to MOP as well, in a program popularly called "Red MOP."

Each year, the top 12 scorers on the USAMO are considered for selection to the IMO team for the United States. The students are trained at the MOP at Carnegie Mellon University, and then six are selected to the team. The next approximately 18 high scorers, usually excluding high school seniors, are also invited to MOP.

Exam content for USAMO
Here are the subjects on the test in different years by problem number (i.e. what subject each problem was from). Calculus, although allowed, is never required in solutions.
2019:
Algebra
Geometry
Number theory
Combinatorics
Number theory
Algebra
2018:
Algebra
Algebra
Number theory
Number theory
Geometry
Algebra
2017:
Number theory
Combinatorics
Geometry
Combinatorics
Combinatorics
Algebra
2016:
 Combinatorics
 Number theory
 Geometry
 Algebra
 Geometry
 Combinatorics

2015:
 Number theory
 Geometry
 Combinatorics
 Combinatorics
 Number theory
 Algebra
2014:
 Algebra
 Algebra
 Algebra
 Combinatorics
 Geometry
 Number theory
2013:
 Geometry
 Combinatorics
 Combinatorics
 Algebra
 Number theory
 Geometry

2012:
Algebra
 Combinatorics
 Number theory
 Algebra
 Geometry
 Combinatorics

2011:
 Algebra
 Combinatorics
 Geometry
 Number theory
 Geometry
 Algebra

2010:
 Geometry
 Combinatorics
 Algebra
 Geometry
 Number theory
 Combinatorics

2009:
 Geometry
 Combinatorics
 Combinatorics
 Algebra
 Geometry
 Number theory

2008:
 Number theory
 Geometry
 Combinatorics
 Combinatorics
 Combinatorics
 Combinatorics

2007:
 Algebra
 Geometry
 Combinatorics
 Graph theory
 Number theory
 Geometry
2006:
 Number theory
 Algebra
 Number theory
 Algebra
 Combinatorics
 Geometry

2005:
 Combinatorics
 Number theory
 Geometry
 Combinatorics
 Combinatorics
 Number theory

2004:
 Geometry
 Number theory
 Combinatorics
 Combinatorics
 Algebra
 Algebra

2003:
 Number theory
 Geometry
 Algebra
 Geometry
 Algebra
 Combinatorics
2002:
Combinatorics
Algebra
Algebra
Algebra
Combinatorics
Combinatorics
2001:
Combinatorics
Geometry
Algebra
Geometry
Number theory
Combinatorics
2000:
Algebra
Algebra
Combinatorics
Combinatorics
Geometry
Algebra

Exam Content for USAJMO
Here are the subjects on the test in different years by problem number (i.e. what subject each problem was from). Calculus, although allowed, is never required in solutions.

2017:
 Number theory
 Algebra
 Geometry
 Number theory
 Geometry
 Combinatorics

2016:
 Geometry
 Number theory
 Combinatorics
 Combinatorics
 Geometry
 Algebra

2015:
 Combinatorics
 Number theory
 Geometry
 Algebra
 Geometry
 Combinatorics
2014:
 Algebra
 Geometry
 Algebra
 Number theory 
 Combinatorics/Game theory 
 Geometry
2013:
 Number theory
 Combinatorics
 Geometry
 Combinatorics/Number theory
 Geometry
 Algebra

2012:
 Geometry
 Algebra
 Algebra
 Geometry/Algebra
 Algebra
 Geometry

2011:
 Number theory
 Algebra
 Geometry/Algebra
 Combinatorics
 Geometry
 Number theory

2010:
 Combinatorics
 Algebra
 Algebra
 Geometry
 Combinatorics
 Geometry

Awards
The Top 12 on the USAMO and USAJMO are named Winners and automatically qualify for Mathematical Olympiad Program (MOP) (except for seniors, who only qualify for the MOP if they were in the Team Selection Test group from the previous year). The remaining spots at MOP are filled via the MOP selection process.

See also

 American Mathematics Competitions
 List of mathematics competitions

References

External links
 United States of America Mathematical Olympiad - Contains rules, problems, qualifiers, and winners for each year since 1998
 The IMO Compendium - huge collection of problems from mathematical competitions, and the most complete collection of IMO shortlists and longlists.
 Art of Problem Solving - a large community of Olympiad problems solvers from around the globe.
 How to Write a Proof
 An archive of USAMO Problems

Mathematics competitions
International Mathematical Olympiad
Recurring events established in 1972
Education competitions in the United States